Dominic Anciano (born 1959) is an English producer, actor, director, writer and comedian best known for his role as Sgt. Dominic de Sade in the British comedy television series Operation Good Guys.

His first notable work was in the pioneering days of the pop and rock videos, when he wrote, produced and directed a significant number of award winning shorts. His first foray into feature films was with Philip Ridley's The Reflecting Skin where he was the producer along with Ray Burdis. Dominic produced The Krays, also written by Philip Ridley and starring Gary and Martin Kemp.
This film was one of the most successful, both critically and financially, in the UK indie industry, winning BAFTAS and The Evening Standard's best film award along with numerous other awards.

In 1995 Dominic produced The Passion of Darkly Noon. Co-financed by the UK, Germany and Belgium this film attracted big American stars in the form of Brendan Fraser and Ashley Judd and went on to become a cult hit in the festival circuit, winning several awards, including Best Director at the Porto Film Festival. 1995 also saw Anciano step away from the arthouse fold to work on Stephen Norrington's Death Machine, where he also made a cameo appearance as a corpse in a restaurant!!

In 1997 Anciano and Burdis turned to their own creations – jointly writing, directing, producing and starring in the TV series Operation Good Guys. Anciano appeared as Sgt. Dominic de Sade (the first of several productions where he would cast himself using his own forename) and Burdis appeared as Det. Sgt. Ash.
Operation Good Guys was seen as a ground breaking series for the BBC and won the coveted Silver Rose D'or and Prix de la presse at Montreux.
Dominic went on to Write, produce and direct three successful seasons.

Anciano then turned his attentions to the world of film.
Taking the award winning formula of Operation Good Guys, he then co wrote produced and directed "Final Cut" which starred Jude Law and Sadie Frost. Using a unique approach to film making with improvisation and video techniques, the film caught the imagination of the critics and film festivals. The Guardian called Final Cut "Genius" and the film showed at Cannes.
The next year Anciano/Burdis was approached by the BBC to write, produce and direct "Love Honour and Obey" a comedy/drama based in the dark world of London's criminal gangs.
Although not loved by the British critics the film went on to be one of the financially most successful in the Brit indie scene of that year.  
Both films had a stellar cast including Jude Law, Jonny Lee Miller, Ray Winstone, Rhys Ifans and Sean Pertwee.
Since 2001 Anciano has directed and written a number of TV productions. Moving away from comedy and into action/drama he has written several TV screenplays along with film scripts that have been successfully sold around the world.
In 2006 Dominic became the creative director for Warner Music Entertainment, which heralded his move into new media. 
Anciano still continues to write and direct and lives in Spain and London.

External links
 https://www.imdb.com/name/nm0025823/

1959 births
Living people
English male film actors
English male television actors